Victoire Sidémého Dzidudu Dogbé Tomegah (born 23 December 1959) is a Togolese politician who has served as the prime minister of Togo since 28 September 2020. She is the first woman to hold the office.

Before becoming head of government, Tomegah Dogbé was previously the Minister of Grassroots Development, Handicrafts, Youth and Youth Employment in the Komi Sélom Klassou Government and the Cabinet Director of President Faure Essozimna Gnassingbé.

Career 
In 2008, while she was at the United Nations Development Programme office in Benin, the President of the Republic Faure Essozimna Gnassingbé and the Prime Minister Gilbert Houngbo asked Dogbé Tomégah to manage the portfolio of Minister Delegate to the Prime Minister in charge of development at the base which had just been created in Togo.

In 2010, following the re-election of President Faure Gnassingbé, Tomegah Dogbé was appointed Minister of Grassroots Development, Youth Craft and Youth Employment in Gilbert Houngbo's second mandate. She retained her ministerial functions in the 1st government of Kwesi Ahoomey-Zunu from 2012 to 2013 and the 2nd government of Ahoomey-Zunu from 2013 to 2015. After the presidential election of April 2015, Komi Sélom Klassou replaced Ahoomey-Zunu as prime minister on 5 June 2015. Klaassou formed his cabinet on 28 June 2015 in which Tomegah Dogbé still retained the Ministry of Development at the Base, crafts, youth and youth employment.

Tobegah Dogbe was named prime minister on 28 September 2020 by President Faure Gnassingbe after the resignation of Komi Selom Klassou.

See also
 Mila Aziablé

References 

1959 births
Living people
21st-century Togolese politicians
21st-century Togolese women politicians
Government ministers of Togo
People from Lomé
Prime Ministers of Togo
Union for the Republic (Togo) politicians
United Nations Development Programme officials
Women government ministers of Togo
Women prime ministers